Luke, Crystal Gazer is a 1916 American short comedy film starring Harold Lloyd.

Cast
 Harold Lloyd as Lonesome Luke
 Snub Pollard as (as Harry Pollard)
 Bebe Daniels
 Charles Stevenson (as Charles E. Stevenson)
 Billy Fay
 Fred C. Newmeyer
 A.H. Frahlich
 Sammy Brooks
 Eva Thatcher (as Evelyn Thatcher)
 Rose Mendel
 Ben Corday
 Dee Lampton
 C.A. Self
 L.A. Gregor
 Ray Wyatt as Spikeman, C.
 Minna Browne
 Lionel Comport
 Harry Todd
 Bud Jamison
 May Cloy

See also
 Harold Lloyd filmography

References

External links

1916 films
1916 short films
American silent short films
American black-and-white films
Lonesome Luke films
Films directed by Hal Roach
1916 comedy films
Silent American comedy films
American comedy short films
1910s American films